Pepe is a 1960 American musical comedy film starring Cantinflas in the title role, directed by George Sidney. The film contained a multitude of cameo appearances, attempting to replicate the success of Cantiflas' American debut Around the World in 80 Days.

The film received generally unfavorable reviews from critics and failed to match the box-office success of his previous American film. The movie was issued on VHS tape in 1998; to date, a DVD and a Blu-ray have been released in Spain, but none in the United States.

Plot
Pepe is a hired hand, employed on a ranch. A boozing Hollywood director, Mr. Holt, buys a white stallion that belongs to Pepe's boss. Pepe, determined to get the horse back (as he considers it his family), decides to go to Hollywood. There he meets film stars, including Jimmy Durante, Frank Sinatra, Zsa Zsa Gabór, Bing Crosby, Maurice Chevalier and Jack Lemmon in drag as Daphne from Some Like It Hot.  He is also surprised by things that were new in the U.S. at the time, such as automatic doors. When he finally reaches the man who bought the horse, he is led to believe there is no hope of getting it back. However Mr. Holt offers him a job when he realizes that Pepe brings new life to the stallion. With his luck changing, Pepe wins big money in Las Vegas, enough that Mr. Hold lets him be the producer of his next movie. Most of the movie centers around his meeting Suzie Murphy, an actress on hard times who hates the world. Just like with the stallion, Pepe brings out the best in Suzie and helps her become a big star in a movie made by Mr. Holt. The last scene shows both him and the stallion back at the ranch with several foals.

Cast
 Cantinflas as Pepe
 Dan Dailey as Ted Holt
 Shirley Jones as Suzie Murphy
 Carlos Montalbán as Rodríguez (auctioneer)
 Vicki Trickett as Lupita
 Matt Mattox as Dancer
 Hank Henry as Manager
 Suzanne Lloyd as Carmen
 Carlos Rivas as Carlos
 Michael Callan as Dancer
 William Demarest as Movie Studio Gateman

Cameos

 Joey Bishop as himself
 Billie Burke
 Maurice Chevalier as himself, performing a number
 Charles Coburn as himself
 Richard Conte as himself
 Bing Crosby as himself
 Tony Curtis
 Bobby Darin as himself, performing a number
 Ann B. Davis as her TV character Schultzy
 Sammy Davis Jr. as himself, performing a number in Las Vegas
 Jimmy Durante as man at casino
 Zsa Zsa Gabór
 Judy Garland (voice only)
 Greer Garson as herself
 Hedda Hopper
 Ernie Kovacs as border official
 Peter Lawford as himself
 Janet Leigh
 Jack Lemmon as himself, wearing his outfit from Some Like It Hot
 Dean Martin
 Jay North as his TV character Dennis the Menace
 Kim Novak as herself
 André Previn
 Donna Reed as herself, talking to Edward G. Robinson
 Debbie Reynolds as herself, dancing with Cantiflas in a dream sequence
 Edward G. Robinson
 Cesar Romero as a man next to a slot machine
 Frank Sinatra as himself

Production
In August 1957 George Sidney Productions announced Leonard Spigelglass was working on the screenplay of a vehicle for Cantiflas called Magic.  In November of that year Sidney announced the film was called Pepe.

The film was based on an Austrian musical revue, Broadway Zauber ("Broadway Magic"), whose debut in Vienna in 1935 was reviewed by Variety. 

In April 1959 contracts were signed with Columbia to produce and release the film. George Sidney was to direct and co produce, under his own banner, along with Jacques Gelman, head of Posa International films.

George Sidney later recalled "there were problems dealing with the logistics of making a picture in two countries with a writer's strike going on at the same time. It was difficult trying to schedule around this person and that person and getting all of the people together. Shooting in Mexico with two sets of crew down there posed problems. I was moving back and forth and any time I was in one place I needed to be in another place." Sidney says that because of the writers strike, Durante and Cantiflas had to ad lib their scene together. "It turned out to be pretty funny," said Sidney. "The studio thought we had hired writers on the black market."

It was Judy Garland’s first film work since A Star is Born was released in 1954. She was slated to make an onscreen appearance. However she was still recovering from illness and the producers decided to limit it to a song.

Reception
Bosley Crowther of The New York Times was not impressed. "The rare and wonderful talents of Mexican comedian Cantinflas, who was nicely introduced to the general public as the valet in Around the World in 80 Days, are pitifully spent and dissipated amid a great mass of Hollywooden dross in the oversized, over-peopled Pepe, which opened at the Criterion last night."

Variety said it had a "wealth of entertainment" as well as "dull spots".

Soundtrack album
The soundtrack was issued in 1960 by Colpix Records in the U.S. (CP 507) and Pye International Records in the UK (NPL 28015). The tracks were:

Side One
 "Pepe" sung by Shirley Jones
 "Mimi" / September Song sung by Maurice Chevalier
 "Hooray for Hollywood" sung by Sammy Davis Jr.
 "The Rumble" (André Previn) – orchestral version

Side Two
 "That's How It Went, All Right" (Dory Langdon Previn / André Previn) sung by Bobby Darin
 "The Faraway Part of Town" (Dory Langdon Previn / André Previn) sung by Judy Garland
 "Suzy's Theme" (Johnny Green) – orchestral version
 "Pennies from Heaven" / Let's Fall in Love / South of the Border sung by Bing Crosby
 "Lovely Day" (Agustín Lara / Dory Langdon Previn) sung by Shirley Jones

Awards and nominations

Comic book adaption
 Dell Four Color #1194 (April 1961)

See also
 List of American films of 1960

References

External links

 
 
 

1960 films
1960 musical comedy films
American musical comedy films
Columbia Pictures films
Films directed by George Sidney
Films scored by Johnny Green
Films set in Los Angeles
Films adapted into comics
1960s English-language films
1960s American films